Ardali (also Romanized as Ard‘alī and Ārd ‘Alī; also known as Ard ‘Alī-ye Chāvoshī and Ardeh ‘Alī) is a village in Hasanabad Rural District, Hasanabad District, Eqlid County, Fars Province, Iran. At the 2006 census, its population was 701, in 140 families.

References 

Populated places in Eqlid County